Ernest A. Davidson was an American architect.

Among his works are two National Park Service building complexes at Mount Rainier National Park, both designated National Historic Landmarks:
Longmire Buildings
Yakima Park Stockade Group

In 1932, Ernest A. Davidson pondered the result of development in Mt. Rainier's Yakima Park, noting it could be classed as a failure "since the area is far less attractive" than before construction, or it might be considered a great success "since the general appearance and result is far superior to those other developments with which comparison may be made, and 'just grew' like topsy".

References

American architects
Year of birth missing
Year of death missing